Corlough is a Roman Catholic parish situated in the Barony of Tullyhaw, County Cavan, Ireland. It  derives its name from Corlough townland, in which the parish church is situate. It formed part of the larger parish of Templeport until 1877 when Corlough was made a separate parish. The name of Corlough parish has an unclear derivation. Some references propose it means either 'the Hill of the Lake' or "the Lake of the Herons". These are unlikely meanings as there is no lake in the townland. The earliest reference to the townland is in the 1790 list of Cavan townlands where it is spelled "Corclagh", which would be an Anglicization of "Cor Cloch", meaning either 'the Stone on the Round Hill' or "the Stony Hill", a more likely explanation.

Townlands in Corlough parish
Aghnacollia;
Altachullion Lower;
Altachullion Upper;
Altateskin;
Altcrock;
Altinure;
Altnadarragh;
Arderry;
Ardvagh;
Cartronnagilta;
Clarbally;
Corlough townland;
Cornacleigh;
Corracholia Beg;
Corracholia More;
Corrachomera;
Corraclassy;
Corranierna (Corlough);
Corratillan;
Cronery;
Culliagh;
Curraghabweehan;
Derry Beg;
Derryconnessy;
Derry More;
Derrynacreeve;
Derrynaslieve;
Derryvahan;
Derryvella (Corlough);
Drumbeagh;
Drumlaydan;
Eaglehill;
Garvary (Corlough);
Gortnacargy;
Gowlan;
Greaghnadoony;
Gubnagree;
Knockmore, County Cavan;
Lannanerriagh;
Leitra, Corlough;
Moneynure;
Muineal;
Owencam;
Prospect, Corlough;
Scrabby, Corlough;
Tawnagh;
Teeboy;
Tirnawannagh;
Tonlegee;
Torrewa;
Tullandreen;
Tullybrack;
Tullyloughfin;
Tullynaconspod;
Tullynamoltra;
Tullytrasna;
Tullyveela;
Tullywaum;

Transport
Bus Éireann Thursdays only route 464 (Carrigallen-Ballinamore-Enniskillen) serves Corlough Cross.

See also
 Patrick McGovern (Irish politician)

External links
A map of Corlough
Corlough Horse Museum
Corlough GAA Club
A photo of Corlough R.C. Chapel

References

Geography of County Cavan